South Hall is located on the campus of what is now the University of Wisconsin-River Falls. It was added to the National Register of Historic Places in 1976.

History
South Hall was built in 1898 after a fire had destroyed the previous building that housed the school a year earlier.  The building was designed by Oshkosh architect William Waters. At the time, as the sole building on campus, it was simply known as the "Normal School". It became known by its current name after the construction of North Hall in 1914.

References

University of Wisconsin–River Falls
Schools in Pierce County, Wisconsin
University and college buildings on the National Register of Historic Places in Wisconsin
School buildings completed in 1898
National Register of Historic Places in Pierce County, Wisconsin